The 2012 AMA Pro Daytona Sportbike Championship was the fourth running of the AMA Pro Daytona Sportbike Championship. The championship covered 11 rounds beginning at Daytona International Speedway on March 17 and concluded at NOLA Motorsports Park on October 7.
The championship was won by Colombian Martín Cárdenas aboard a Suzuki.

Calendar

  = World Superbike Weekend
  = MotoGP weekend

External links
The official website of the AMA Pro Racing Championship

AMA Pro Daytona Sportbike
AMA Pro Daytona Sportbike Championship
Ama Pro